Odontocerum is a genus of mortarjoint casemakers in the family Odontoceridae. There are at least three described species in Odontocerum.

Species
 Odontocerum albicorne (Scopoli, 1763)
 Odontocerum hellenicum Malicky, 1972
 Odontocerum lusitanicum Malicky, 1975

References

Further reading

 
 
 
 

Trichoptera